This is a list of electoral district results for the 1991 New South Wales state election.

Results by Electoral district

Albury

Ashfield

Auburn

Badgerys Creek 

Badgerys Creek was a new seat with a notional Liberal majority.

Ballina

Bankstown

Barwon

Bathurst

Baulkham Hills 

Baulkham Hills was a new seat with a notional Liberal majority.

Bega

Blacktown

Bligh 

Bligh became a notional Liberal seat as a result of the 1990 redistribution, however Clover Moore (Independent) retained the seat with an increased margin.

Blue Mountains

Broken Hill 

Broken Hill became a notional Country seat as a result of the 1990 redistribution, however Bill Beckroge (Labor) retained the seat with an increased margin.

Bulli 

Bulli was a new seat with a notional Labor majority.

Burrinjuck

Cabramatta

Camden

Campbelltown

Canterbury

Cessnock

Charlestown

Clarence

Coffs Harbour

Coogee

Cronulla

Davidson

Drummoyne 

Drummoyne became a notional Liberal seat as a result of the 1990 redistribution, however John Murray (Laborr) retained the seat with an increased margin.

Dubbo

East Hills

Eastwood

Ermington 

Ermington was a new seat with a notional Liberal majority.

Fairfield

Georges River

Gladesville

Gordon

Gosford

Granville

Hawkesbury

Heffron

Hurstville

Illawarra

Keira

Kiama

Kogarah

Ku-ring-gai

Lachlan

Lake Macquarie

Lakemba

Lane Cove

Lismore

Liverpool

Londonderry

Maitland

Manly

Maroubra

Marrickville

Miranda

Monaro

Moorebank

Mount Druitt 

Mount Druit was a new seat with a notional Labor majority.

Murray

Murrumbidgee

Murwillumbah

Myall Lakes

Newcastle

North Shore 

The sitting member was Robyn Read (Independent) however North Shore became a notional Liberal seat as a result of the 1990 redistribution.

Northcott

Northern Tablelands

Orange

Oxley

Parramatta 

The sitting member was John Books (Liberal) however Parramatta became a notional Labor seat as a result of the 1990 redistribution.

Peats

Penrith

Pittwater

Port Jackson 

Port Jackson was a new seat with a notional Labor majority.

Port Macquarie

Port Stephens 

Port Stephens became a notional Liberal seat as a result of the 1990 redistribution, however Bob Martin (Labor) retained the seat with an increased margin.

Riverstone

Rockdale

St Marys 

St Mary's was a new seat with a notional Labor majority.

Smithfield

South Coast

Southern Highlands

Strathfield

Sutherland

Swansea

Tamworth

The Entrance 

This result was overturned by the Court of Disputed Returns and a by-election was called, where Labor won.

The Hills

Upper Hunter

Vaucluse

Wagga Wagga

Wakehurst

Wallsend

Waratah

Willoughby 

Willoughby was a new seat with a notional Liberal majority.

Wollongong

Wyong

See also 

 Results of the 1991 New South Wales state election (Legislative Council)
 Candidates of the 1991 New South Wales state election
 Members of the New South Wales Legislative Assembly, 1991–1995

References 

1991 Legislative Assembly